Trepostomatida (the trepostomates) is an extinct order of bryozoans in the class Stenolaemata. Trepostome bryozoans possessed mineralized calcitic skeletons and are frequently fossilized; some of the largest known fossilized bryozoan colonies are branching trepostomes and massive dome-shaped trepostomes.  Trepostomes did not have many specialized zooecia beyond ordinary feeding autozooecia. The two main known heteromorphs are exilazooecia and mesozooecia, which had the purpose of maintaining regular spacing between autozooecia.

See also
 Taxonomy of commonly fossilised invertebrates

References

External links

 
Prehistoric animal orders
Prehistoric bryozoans
Extinct bryozoans